Jonathan Paul Lowe (born 13 November 1977) is an English former first-class cricketer and British Army officer.

Lowe was born at Pontefract in November 1977. He was educated at the Queen Elizabeth Grammar School in Wakefield, before going up to Girton College, Cambridge. While studying at Cambridge, he played first-class cricket for Cambridge University Cricket Club from 1998 to 2000, making eleven appearances. Playing as a medium pace bowler, he took 8 wickets at an expensive average of 81.75 runs per wicket; his best bowling figures were 2 for 42. After graduating from Cambridge, he attended the Royal Military Academy Sandhurst. He graduated in January 2002, entering into the Army Air Corps as a second lieutenant. He gained promotion to captain in June 2004, before being made a major in July 2009. A further promotion to lieutenant colonel followed in June 2017, with Lowe gaining his Army Long Service and Good Conduct Medal in October 2018.

References

External links

1977 births
Living people
People from Pontefract
People educated at Queen Elizabeth Grammar School, Wakefield
Alumni of Girton College, Cambridge
English cricketers
Cambridge University cricketers
Graduates of the Royal Military Academy Sandhurst
British Army Air Corps officers
Military personnel from Yorkshire